Ramy Sabry may refer to:

 Ramy Sabry (singer) (born 1978), Egyptian singer
 Ramy Sabry (footballer) (born 1987), Egyptian footballer